John M. Faucette (September 15, 1943–2003) was an African-American science-fiction author. He published five novels (four of them in the 1960s) and one short story. At the time of his death he had seven unpublished novels in various states of completion. Two of his novels; Crown of Infinity and Age of Ruin, were published in the popular Ace Doubles series.

Faucette was born and raised in Harlem and lived there for twenty-six years. He graduated from Bronx High School of Science and majored in chemistry at the Polytechnic Institute of Brooklyn before studying filmmaking, screenplay, and short-story writing at New York University's School of Continuing Education.

Faucette died of a heart attack in 2003.

Bibliography

Published
Crown of Infinity (1968)
Siege of Earth (1971)
The Warriors of Terra (Belmont Books, 1970)
The Age of Ruin (1968)
Disco Hustle (Holloway House, 1978)
The Secret - AIM Magazine (1999)
Messenger of God - AIM Magazine (2001)
Pets - Artemis Magazine (2001)
Black Science Fiction (2002) Publisher: Macro Publishing Group (May 15, 2002) , 437 pages.

Unpublished
Earth Will be Avenged
The Gypsy Dick
The Tan Argus III Interstellar Chess Tournament
Sex Death
Tell My People
Homo Cosmos
The Ghettoes of Hell

Notes

References
 Internet Book List
 The Novels of John Faucette
 SF Site: In Memoriam January 2003

External links
Technovelgy.com: John Faucette's Total Environmental and Mental Simulator

1943 births
2003 deaths
20th-century American novelists
African-American novelists
American male novelists
American science fiction writers
People from Harlem
American male short story writers
20th-century American short story writers
20th-century American male writers
Novelists from New York (state)
20th-century African-American writers
21st-century African-American people
African-American male writers